San Pedro del Gallo is a town and seat of the municipality of San Pedro del Gallo, in the state of Durango, north-western Mexico. As of 2010, the town had a population of 634.

References

Populated places in Durango